Ottavio Bugatti (25 September 1928 – 13 September 2016) was an Italian footballer from Lentate sul Seveso, in the province of Milan, who played as a goalkeeper.

Club career
Bugatti played club football for Napoli and Inter; while at Napoli he played himself into the appearance records books at the club, today he is seventh in the club's all-time appearance records for the league. With Inter he won the Italian Championship twice.

International career
At the international level, Bugatti represented Italy seven times, and represented the nation at the 1952 Summer Olympics.

Honours
Inter
 Serie A (2): 1962–63, 1964–65
 European Cup (2): 1963–64, 1964–65
 Intercontinental Cup (2): 1964, 1965

Filmography
Bugatti also appeared in a comedy movie.
1961 - Il Giudizio universale

References

1928 births
2016 deaths
Sportspeople from the Province of Monza e Brianza
Italian footballers
Serie A players
U.S. 1913 Seregno Calcio players
S.P.A.L. players
S.S.C. Napoli players
Inter Milan players
Italy international footballers
Olympic footballers of Italy
Footballers at the 1952 Summer Olympics
Association football goalkeepers
Footballers from Lombardy